Suchitepéquez may refer to:
 Suchitepéquez Department, a department in Guatemala
 Suchitepéquez District, a district in Sololá-Suchitepéquez Department
 C.D. Suchitepéquez, a sports club